Lady Fan is a Hong Kong television series starring Jessica Hsuan as the lady warrior Fan Lei-fa (Fan Lihua) and Joe Ma as Sit Ding-san (Xue Dingshan). The series was first aired on TVB in 2004. The plot is an adaptation of an earlier TVB production, General Father, General Son.

Plot
The story is set during a time where the Tang Dynasty was at war.  Lei Fa is the daughter of a respected Sai Leung general. Her mother died when she was young, so she has been raised by her father and brothers and developed a forthright, outspoken personality as a result. Her martial arts master, the Holy Mother of Lei Mountain, tells her that she is destined to marry a Tang citizen and their marriage will unite the two kingdoms and bring about a time of peace and harmony.

Unfortunately for her, her destined husband turns out to be Sit Ding San.  His father is Sit Yan Kwai, a renowned and loyal general of the Tang Dynasty.  The Sit family is very prejudiced against Sai Leung citizens, as they have long been at war against each other.  The show follows Lei Fa as she wins Ding San's love, his family's affections and the respect and loyalty of the Tang troops.

Cast

Jessica Hsuan as Fan Lei Fa 樊梨花
Law Lok Lam as Fan Hung 樊洪
Edward Mok as Fan Wei 樊威
Wai Ka Hung as Fan Mo 樊武
Joe Ma as Sit Ding San 薛丁山
Bill Chan as Sit Yan Kwai 薛仁貴
Cherie Kong as Chan Kam Ding 陳金定
Power Chan as Sit Ying Lung 薛應龍
Cindy Au as Sit Kam Lin 薛金蓮
Mimi Lo as Dou Sin Tong 竇仙童
Chun Wong as Ching Ngau Kam 程咬金
Ching Hor Wai as Lau Kam Fa 柳金花
Dickson Lee as Bo Yut Fu 竇一虎
Suet Nei as Lei San Sing Mo 梨山聖母 (Fan Lei Fa's Teacher)
Lau Kong as Chan Fu 陳父
Kong Hon as Lee Do Chung 李道宗
Liu Kai Chi as Li Sai Man 李世民
Deno Cheung as Lord So Lak 疏勒藩主
Yvonne Ho as Dai To Po 大肚婆
Hoffman Cheng as a guard

References

TVB dramas
Television series set in the Tang dynasty
2004 Hong Kong television series debuts
2004 Hong Kong television series endings